Chris Savido (born Wilkinsburg, Pennsylvania) is an American artist whose acrylic portrait of George W. Bush composed of monkeys created controversy when the managers of Chelsea Market closed down the "ANIMAL'S PARADISE" art exhibition there because of it.  It was later auctioned on eBay.

There was debate over whether the closing of the show constituted censorship.  Supporters of the managers claimed that Chelsea Market was private, and thus management had a right to exclude the painting, while supporters of Savido "[looked] into the degree to which the Chelsea Market walkways are legally definable as 'public space,' and, as such, fully protected by the First Amendment."

Anonymous donors later paid for a digital billboard over the Holland Tunnel to show a detail of the painting.

See also
David Černý
Angela Singer
Cosimo Cavallaro

References
Notes

Sources
"Show highlights 'constant flow'" (on "Flux" group show, in which Savido participated)

External links
Statement by Chris Savido
The Green Man: Art - Ethics - Culture - Science

Surviving Ourselves Magazine
24 Hours to Live: Bush Monkeys by Christ Savido
BradNewman: Bush Monkeys by Chris Savido

Living people
20th-century American painters
Year of birth missing (living people)
American male painters
People from Wilkinsburg, Pennsylvania
20th-century American male artists